Hjort, also spelled Hiort and Hiorth, is a common surname of some Norwegian and Danish families and persons. The name means hart.

Early harts
 Sigurd Hart, legendary king of Ringerike
 Tore Hjort

The Oslo harts
Rasmus Hjort (1525–1604), Latin Erasmus Cervinus, was a priest in Oslo. He married around 1555 Gidse Frantzdatter Berg, who was the daughter of bishop Frantz Berg and Karine Lauritzdatter. He belonged to the Oslo Humanists. The couple had the son Christoffer Hjort (1561–1616), a crypto-Catholic priest.

The Røros harts
Both Peder Henningsen Hjort (1655–1716) and his son Peder Pedersen Hjort (1715–1789) were directors at Røros Copperwork.

The harts from Jutland
The harts from Jutland are believed to descend from Jacob Schade (b. ca. 1540), who was from Varde in Jutland and perhaps of an old, German noble family. His son Peder Jacobsen Schade (1571–1641) in Kalundborg was the father of Søren Pedersen (Callundborg) (1607–1650). His three sons called themselves Hiort. One of his paternal grandsons, Severin Casper Hiorth (ca. 1668–1717), came to Trondheim in Norway.

Prominent harts
 Alf Hjort (1877–1944), electrical engineer
 Ann Hjort (born 1956), Danish actress
 Christopher Hjort (b. 1958), typographer and graphical designer
 Grethe Hjort (1903–1967), Danish-born professor of Danish and English literature, changed name to Greta Hort
 Johan Hjort (1869–1948), marine zoologist and oceanographer
 Johan Bernhard Hjort (1895–1969), supreme court lawyer
 Nils Lid Hjort (b. 1953), mathematical statistician
 Peder Henningsen Hjort (1655–1716), copperwork director
 Peder Pedersen Hjort (1715–1789), copperwork director
 Vigdis Hjort (b. 1959), novelist

Literature and sources
 Wikipedia, Norwegian Bokmål & Riksmål: Hjort (slekt) (Per 10 April 2011.)
 Store norske leksikon: Hjort (Per 10 April 2011.)
 Store norske leksikon: Rasmus Hjort – utdypning (Per 10 April 2011.)

Norwegian families
Surnames from nicknames